The featherfin cichlid (Cyathopharynx furcifer) is a species of cichlid endemic to Lake Tanganyika where it is found off rocky slopes.  It feeds on plankton.  This fish can reach a length of  TL. It can also be found in the aquarium trade. This is currently the only species recognized in the genus by FishBase, but genetics and morphology suggest there are two valid species. The second is frequently called C. foae in the aquarium trade, but a review of the type specimen is needed to clarify if this is the correct name.

References

featherfin cichlid
Fish of Lake Tanganyika
featherfin cichlid
Taxonomy articles created by Polbot